Esther Williamson Ballou (17 July 1915 – 12 March 1973) was an American music educator, organist and composer. She was born in Elmira, New York, began organ lessons at age 13, and began composing in her twenties. She studied at Bennington College, Mills College and The Juilliard School of Music in 1943.

After completing her education, she married Harold Ballou in August 1950. Her performing career was shortened by arthritis, and she taught at the Juilliard School from 1943–50, at Catholic University from 1951–54 and at American University from 1955–72.

In 1963, her Capriccio for Violin and Piano was the first work by an American woman composer to premiere at the White House. She died in Chichester, England.

Works
Ballou composed orchestra, chamber, organ, piano and vocal music. Selected works include:
Nocturne, 1937
Adagio for Bassoon and String Orchestra, 1962
Allegro for String Quartet
The Art of the Fugue, 1963
A Babe is Born, 1959
Bag of Tricks, 1956
The Beatitudes, 1963
Beguine, 1960
Beguine for Two Pianos, 1958
Berceuse for Piano Forte, 1956
Blues, 1944
Brass Sextette with Piano Forte, 1962
Bride, 1963
Capriccio for Violin and Piano, 1963
Christmas Mass (Palestrina)
Chromatic Invention
Concerto for Guitar and Orchestra, 1964
Concerto for Piano and Orchestra, 1964
Concerto for Piano and Orchestra, 1965
Concerto for Piano and Orchestra, 1964
Concerto for Viola and Orchestra, 1969

She published a text: 
Creative Explorations of Musical Elements (1971)

References

External links
Concerto for Solo Guitar and Chamber Orchestra (1963) from YouTube

1915 births
1973 deaths
20th-century classical composers
American women classical composers
American classical composers
American music educators
American women music educators
People from Elmira, New York
Bennington College alumni
Mills College alumni
Juilliard School alumni
Juilliard School faculty
Benjamin T. Rome School of Music, Drama, and Art faculty
American University faculty and staff
American classical organists
Women organists
20th-century American women musicians
20th-century American musicians
20th-century American composers
20th-century organists
Classical musicians from New York (state)
20th-century women composers
American women academics